Milton O. Browne (born 1 June 1976) is a Barbadian middle-distance runner. He competed in the men's 800 metres at the 2000 Summer Olympics.

References

External links
 

1976 births
Living people
Athletes (track and field) at the 2000 Summer Olympics
Barbadian male middle-distance runners
Olympic athletes of Barbados
Athletes (track and field) at the 1999 Pan American Games
Pan American Games competitors for Barbados
Place of birth missing (living people)